Millwood is an unincorporated community in northwestern Jackson County, West Virginia, United States, along the Ohio River at the mouth of Mill Creek.  It lies along West Virginia Routes 2 and 62 northwest of the city of Ripley, the county seat of Jackson County.  Its elevation is 577 feet (176 m).  Although Millwood is unincorporated, it has a post office, with the ZIP code of 25262.

Climate
The climate in this area is characterized by relatively high temperatures and evenly distributed precipitation throughout the year.  According to the Köppen Climate Classification system, Millwood has a Humid subtropical climate, abbreviated "Cfa" on climate maps.

Notable person 
 Warren Miller, U.S. Representative from West Virginia

See also
List of cities and towns along the Ohio River

References

Unincorporated communities in Jackson County, West Virginia
Unincorporated communities in West Virginia
West Virginia populated places on the Ohio River